David Nicholson Finnie (August 2, 1883 – October 29, 1969) was a Canadian ice hockey goaltender for the Ottawa Hockey Club. He was a member of the famous "Silver Seven" era of the team, Stanley Cup champions from 1903–1906. He was a member of the Stanley-Cup winning team in 1905.

Career
Finnie grew  up in Ottawa, and played for the Ottawa Aberdeens. In 1904–05, after the retirement of Bouse Hutton, he became the starting goalie for Ottawa. The team was the reigning Stanley Cup champion, by winning the Federal Amateur Hockey League (FAHL) season and a Stanley Cup challenge match against the Dawson City Nuggets. He was the Ottawa goaltender only for the one season. Billy Hague won the job the next season. He played for the Montreal Hockey Club in 1907–08.

Finnie died on October 29, 1969, in Waterloo, New York.

References

1883 births
1969 deaths
Ice hockey people from Ottawa
Montreal Hockey Club players
Ottawa Senators (original) players
Stanley Cup champions